Calbi is a surname. Notable people with the surname include:
Greg Calbi (born 1949), American sound engineer
Maria Calbi, Argentine American physicist
 (1917–1995), Italian composer and musician
 (1683–1761), Italian physician and poet